Martina Navratilova and Pam Shriver defeated Claudia Kohde-Kilsch and Helena Suková in the final, 7–6(6–1), 6–3 to win the doubles tennis title at the November edition of the 1986 Virginia Slims Championships. It was Navratilova's ninth Tour Finals doubles title, and Shriver's sixth.

Hana Mandlíková and Wendy Turnbull were the defending champions, but were defeated in the semifinals by Navratilova and Shriver.

Seeds

Draw

Draw

References
 Official Results Archive (ITF)
 Official Results Archive (WTA)

Doubles
Doubles